Operation Fath-ol-Mobin (a Quranic phrase meaning "Undeniable Victory" or "Manifest Victory") was a major Iranian military operation conducted during the Iran–Iraq War, in March 1982. The operation was led by Lt. General Ali Sayad Shirazi, and was conducted in four phases.

Some believe that this operation was the turning point in the war and that it  led to the eviction of Iraqi troops from Khuzestan. Others (including Efraim Karsh) believe it was actually the operation working in tandem with others which led to the expulsion of Iraqi troops from southern Iran. He believes that in fact, Operation Beit ol-Moqaddas, which lasted from April to May 1982, had the greatest effect, because the Iranians were able to liberate the strategically important city of Khorramshahr.

Prelude
On 22 September 1980, Saddam Hussein, attempting to copy the success of the Israeli pre-emptive air strike against the Arab air forces in the Six-Day War, launched numerous sorties against Iranian air fields, hoping to destroy the Iranian air force on the ground. Although they failed, Saddam was still not going to be prevented from achieving his aim of establishing complete Iraqi dominance over the Shatt al-Arab, called Arvand Rood in Iran (Persian: اروند رود) waterway. He launched a land invasion of Iran, focusing on southern Iran.

He was able to achieve success, capturing the major Iranian city of Khorramshahr. Although the Iraqis were not able to capture the city of Abadan, the way was open to Tehran as the Iranian defenses had collapsed. The Iraqi advance was halted at the Karun and Karkheh rivers respectively and now Iran was able to counter-attack; although their previous counter-attacks had ended in failure, this one would be successful.

The battle
On 22 March 1982, precisely 18 months to the day of the Iraqi invasion, the Iranians launched Operation Fath ol-Mobin.  They intended to use a pincer movement to encircle Iraqi forces who had halted outside the Iranian town of Shush.  Under the command of the young Iranian Chief-of-Staff, Lieutenant General Ali Sayad Shirazi, the Iranians launched an armored thrust on the night of the 22nd followed by constant human-wave attacks by Pasdaran and Basij brigades, each composed of about 1,000 fighters.

The Iranians suffered much greater casualties than the Iraqis, because the Iranian attack at times involved massive unsupported frontal assaults made by the Pasdaran and Basij. The Iranian forces still had to contend with an Iraqi army which was entrenched on the front-line and they enjoyed a good amount of tank, artillery, and aerial support. The Iranians kept up the momentum against the Iraqi forces and, after heavy Iraqi losses, Saddam ordered a retreat on the 28th. Three Iraqi divisions were encircled in the operation and destroyed within a week.

Aftermath
Along with Operation Tariq al-Qods and Operation Beit ol-Moqaddas, the Iranians were able to evict the Iraqi forces from southern Iran. The wider operation to re-capture Khuzestan is rightly to be considered a turning point. The Iranians had succeeded in achieving their standing aim of reversing the gains made by the Iraqi armed forces in the initial stages of the Iran-Iraq War. Afterward, the Iranian hardliners, headed by the Speaker of the Iranian Parliament Akbar Hashemi-Rafsanjani, argued for the expansion of Iranian war operations into Iraq. They eventually succeeded in getting their way, and the Iranians commenced several operations to conquer territory.

But where the Iranians successfully used combined-arms operations to emerge victorious against the Iraqi troops in Iran, they relied upon unsupported human wave attacks by the poorly trained and lightly equipped troops of the Pasdaran and the Basij with an insufficient logistics capability. 

The Iraqis eventually stabilized their armed forces after their retreat from Iran. The result was that the Iranians would not be able to press their determined, but futile, assaults against a resurgent Iraqi army. Iraq was supported by both the United States and the Soviet Union who saw Saddam's regime as a much better option than Khomeini's regime.

Units

Iran
Karbala Central Command Commanded by Lt. Gen. Ali Sayyad Shirazi
 Qods Command
 Army:
 84th Infantry Brigade of Khorramabad
 3 battalions
 92nd Armored Division of Khuzestan
 2nd Brigade
 3 battalions
 IRGC:
 41st Tharallah Brigade  Commanded by Qassem Soleimani
 6 battalions
 3rd Imam Hossein Brigade  Commanded by Hossein Kharrazi
 9 battalions
 Ilam corps
 Several units
 Nasr Command  Commanded by Sardar Hassan Baqeri and Amir Hossein Hassani Saadi
 Army:
 21st Hamzeh Infantry Division of Azarbaijan  (10 battalions overall)
 1st Brigade
 2nd Brigade
 3rd Brigade
 58th Zolfaqar Takavar Brigade
 4 battalions
 IRGC:
 7th Vali-e-Asr Brigade
 9 battalions
 27th Mohammad Rasulollah Brigade  Commanded by Ahmad Motevaselian
 Habib ibn Madhahir Battalion  Commanded by Mohsen Vezvaei
 8 other battalions
 Fajr Command
 Army:
 77th Infantry Division of Khorasan
 3 brigades
 IRGC:
 33rd Al-Mahdi Brigade
 6 battalions
 46th Fajr Brigade
 5 battalions
 17th Ali ibn Abi Taleb Brigade
 6 battalions
 35th Imam Sajjad Brigade
 11 battalions
 Fath Command
 Army:
 92nd Armored Division of Khuzestan
 1st Brigade
 37th Armored Brigade of Shiraz
 55th Airborne Brigade of Shiraz
 IRGC:
 8th Najaf Ashraf Brigade
 8 battalions
 25th Karbala Brigade
 Unnamed artillery units
 Unnamed combat engineer and Construction Jihad engineer units
 Islamic Republic of Iran Air Force
 Islamic Republic of Iran Army Aviation

Source:

Iraq
 1st Mechanized Division
 34th Armored Brigade
 51st Armored Brigade
 1st Mechanized Brigade
 27th Mechanized Brigade
 93rd Infantry Brigade
 96th Infantry Brigade
 109th Infantry Brigade
 426th Infantry Brigade
 4 artillery battalions
 3rd Armored Division
 6th Armored Brigade
 12th Armored Brigade
 8th Mechanized Brigade
 3 artillery battalions
 6th Armored Division
 25th Mechanized Brigade
 7th Infantry Division
 19th Infantry Brigade
 38th Infantry Brigade
 9th Armored Division
 14th Mechanized Brigade
 35th Armored Brigade
 43rd Armored Brigade
 10th Armored Division
 17th Armored Brigade
 42nd Armored Brigade
 51st Armored Brigade
 60th Armored Brigade
 24th Mechanized Brigade
 55th Infantry Brigade
 99th Infantry Brigade
 423rd Infantry Brigade
 505th Infantry Brigade
 4 artillery battalions
 12th Armored Division
 10th, 11th, 12th, 13th, 14th, 15th, 19th, 603rd, 604th, 605th Brigades
 Republican Guard
 10th Armored Brigade (backup)
 91st Infantry Brigade
 92nd Infantry Brigade
 5th Border Guard Brigade
 9 commando battalions
 Popular Army
 217th Artillery Battalion
 Iraqi Air Force
 Iraqi Army Air Corps

References

Bibliography
 The Iran–Iraq War, 1980–1988; Karsh, Efraim; Osprey Publishing; 2002
 Iran at War: 1500–1988; Farrokh, Kaveh; General Military; 2011, p. 363

Fath ol-Mobin
History of Khuzestan Province